Maurice Bloch (April 26, 1891 in New York City – December 5, 1929 in Manhattan, New York City) was an American lawyer and politician from New York.

Personal life 
Bloch married Madeline Neuberger (1894–1986) in 1922. Robert F. Wagner Sr., then a judge, acted as best man. Bloch and his wife had two children, a daughter, Jean Doris, and  a son named Robert Wagner Bloch. At the time, Bloch was President of the Park Avenue Synagogue, where a plaque honors him.

Sources
 MAURICE BLOCH A FATHER in NYT on March 5, 1925 (subscription required)
 MAURICE BLOCH DIES AFTER AN OPERATION in NYT on December 6, 1929 (subscription required)
 Obituaries; Madeline N. Bloch in NYT on November 18, 1986

External links
 

1891 births
1929 deaths
People from Manhattan
Democratic Party members of the New York State Assembly
Deaths from embolism
20th-century American politicians